

Events
July 11 – United States Marine Band established by Act of Congress.
September 2 – Opening of the Teatro Comunale (Ferrara) in Italy with a performance of Portogallo's Gli Orazi e i Curiazi.
Opening of the Teatro della Concordia in Iesi, Ancona, "one of the few opera houses in Italy from the late 1700s that has never been destroyed by fire or bombs".
Completion of the first São João National Theatre in Porto, Portugal as an opera house.
Michael Haydn takes on Carl Maria von Weber as a pupil without charge.
First edition of Niemetschek's biography of Mozart published.

Classical Music
Joseph Eybler – Clarinet Concerto in B-flat major
Joseph Haydn 
The Creation
Missa in Angustiis
Leopold Kozeluch – Sinfonia Concertante in E-flat major
Paul Wranitzky – Grande Sinfonie caracteristique in C minor, Op. 31

Published popular music
Edward Jones (Bardd y Brenin) – Popular Cheshire Melodies

Births
January 31 – Carl Gottlieb Reissiger, kapellmeister and composer (d. 1859)
March 9 – Mathilda Berwald, Hovsångare (d. 1877)
October 28 – Henri Bertini, pianist and composer (d. 1876)
date unknown
Andrea Maffei, librettist (d. 1885)
Louis-Désiré Véron, opera manager (d. 1867)
Lovisa Charlotta Borgman, violinist  (d. 1884)

Deaths
January 4 – Giuseppe Giordani, opera composer (b. 1751)
January 20 – Christian Cannabich, composer (b. 1731)
January 28 – Christian Gottlob Neefe, composer and conductor (b. 1748)
July 15 – Gaetano Pugnani, violinist (b. 1731)
November 30 – Friedrich Fleischmann, composer (b. 1766)
December 16 – Gaetano Brunetti, composer (b. 1744)

References

 
18th century in music
Music by year